Earl Spencer is a title in the Peerage of Great Britain that was created on 1 November 1765, along with the title Viscount Althorp, of Althorp in the County of Northampton, for John Spencer, 1st Viscount Spencer. He was a member of the prominent Spencer family and a great-grandson of the 1st Duke of Marlborough. Previously, he had been created Viscount Spencer, of Althorp in the County of Northampton, and Baron Spencer of Althorp, of Althorp in the County of Northampton, on 3 April 1761.

The future 6th Earl Spencer was created Viscount Althorp, of Great Brington in the County of Northampton, on 19 December 1905 in the Peerage of the United Kingdom. Diana, Princess of Wales, was the youngest of three daughters of the 8th Earl Spencer. Prince William, Prince of Wales and Prince Harry, Duke of Sussex are grandsons of the 8th Earl Spencer.

Land holdings
The family seat is Althorp in Northamptonshire. Their estate includes significant land holdings in other parts of the country, including the village of North Creake in Norfolk. The family also holds Spencer House in St James's, London.

Coat of arms
The coat of arms of the family is as follows: Quarterly argent and gules, in the second and third quarters a fret or, over all on a bend sable, three escallops of the first. The crest, emerging from the coronet, is a griffin's head argent, gorged with a bar gemelle gules between two wings expanded of the second. The supporters are: Dexter, a griffin per fess ermine and erminois, gorged with a collar sable, the edges flory-counter-flory, and chained of the last, on the collar, three escallops argent; sinister, a wyvern erect on his tail ermine, collared and chained as the griffin. The motto is Dieu defend le droit (French: God protect the right).

Earls Spencer (1765)

 John Spencer, 1st Earl Spencer (1734–1783)
 George John Spencer, 2nd Earl Spencer (1758–1834)
 John Charles Spencer, 3rd Earl Spencer (1782–1845)
 Frederick Spencer, 4th Earl Spencer (1798–1857)
 John Poyntz Spencer, 5th Earl Spencer (1835–1910)
 Charles Robert Spencer, 6th Earl Spencer (1857–1922)
 Albert Edward John Spencer, 7th Earl Spencer (1892–1975)
 Edward John Spencer, 8th Earl Spencer (1924–1992)
 Charles Edward Maurice Spencer, 9th Earl Spencer (b. 1964)

The heir apparent is the present holder's son Louis Frederick John Spencer, Viscount Althorp (b. 1994).

Family tree

This is a continuation of the Spencer/Spencer-Churchill family tree for the Althorp branch of the Spencers found in the Spencer family article.

Line of succession

  John Spencer, 1st Earl Spencer (1734–1783)
  George Spencer, 2nd Earl Spencer (1758–1834)
  John Charles Spencer, 3rd Earl Spencer (1782–1845)
  Frederick Spencer, 4th Earl Spencer (1798–1857)
  John Spencer, 5th Earl Spencer (1835–1910)
  Charles Spencer, 6th Earl Spencer (1857–1922)
  Albert Spencer, 7th Earl Spencer (1892–1975)
  John Spencer, 8th Earl Spencer (1924–1992)
  Charles Spencer, 9th Earl Spencer (b. 1964)
 (1) Louis Spencer, Viscount Althorp (b. 1994)
 (2) The Hon. Edmund Spencer  (b. 2003)

Arms

See also
 Spencer family
 Spencer Gulf
 Spencer (clothing)

References

Further reading
 Battiscombe, Georgina (1984) The Spencers of Althorp. London: Constable. 
 Spencer, Charles (1999) Althorp: the story of an English house. London: Viking. 
 Spencer, Charles (2000) The Spencers: a personal history of an English family. New York: St. Martin's Press

External links

 Althorp – official website
 Cracroft's Peerage page
 The Heraldry of the Early Spencers
 Heraldry of the House of Spencer

Earldoms in the Peerage of Great Britain
 
Noble titles created in 1765